The South Middleborough Historic District encompasses the historic village center of South Middleborough, Massachusetts. Wareham Street (designated Massachusetts Route 28), was for many years the primary route to Cape Cod, until the construction  in 1966 of Massachusetts Route 24, a divided highway that bypasses the village. Partly because of the highway, the village center has not been significantly altered since that time.

The district includes , with 75 contributing resources. Most of buildings in the district were constructed between the late 18th century and about 1930.  It began to develop as a local center of civic and commercial activity in the second half of the 18th century, when a church (no longer extant, now the site of the 1841 Greek Revival Methodist church) was built and the cemetery was laid out. By the early 19th century a cluster of houses had risen in the area. The arrival of the railroad in 1848 spurred additional growth, including the construction of stores such as the  1890 South Middleborough Store at 32 Spruce Street, and the rise of lumbering as an industry. In the 1920s the rise of the automobile led to increased traffic on the Wareham road, and the village grew to serve the business of passing travelers.  This traffic was considerably reduced by the construction of Route 24, and the village suffered economically.

See also
National Register of Historic Places listings in Plymouth County, Massachusetts

References

National Register of Historic Places in Plymouth County, Massachusetts
Colonial architecture in the United States
Greek Revival architecture in Massachusetts
Buildings and structures completed in 1768
Middleborough, Massachusetts
Historic districts on the National Register of Historic Places in Massachusetts
1768 establishments in Massachusetts